The Shadow Ministry of Simon Crean was the opposition Australian Labor Party shadow ministry of Australia from November 2001 to December 2003, opposing John Howard's Coalition ministry.

The shadow cabinet is a group of senior Opposition spokespeople who form an alternative Cabinet to the government's, whose members shadow or mark each individual Minister or portfolio of the Government.

Simon Crean became Leader of the Opposition upon his election as leader of the Australian Labor Party on 11 November 2001, and appointed his first Shadow Cabinet on 23 November.

November 2001 to August 2002
The following were members of the Shadow Cabinet:

Shadow Outer Ministry

Parliamentary Secretaries

August 2002 to December 2002

Shadow Outer Ministry

Parliamentary Secretaries

See also 
 Third Howard Ministry

References 

Politics of Australia
Opposition of Australia
Crean